Winfred Thaxter Denison (June 30, 1873 – November 5, 1919) was the United States Assistant Attorney General and Secretary of the Interior for the Philippines from 1913 to 1916.

Biography
He was born in Portland, Maine on June 30, 1873. He attended Harvard University and was editor-in-chief of the literary magazine, The Harvard Monthly. Despondent because of ill health he died by suicide when he jumped in front of a subway train at Pennsylvania Station in Manhattan, New York City on November 5, 1919.

References

1873 births
1919 suicides
Suicides by train
United States Assistant Attorneys General
Harvard University alumni
Suicides in New York City